Sope may refer to:

People
 Barak Sopé (born 1951), Vanuatu politician
 Sope Aluko (born 1975), Nigerian-born British American actress
 Sope Dirisu (born 1991), British Nigerian actor
 Sope Johnson
 Sope Willams Elegbe (born 1975), Nigerian professor of law

Places
 Sope Creek, United States
 Sope Lake, Albania

Other
 Sope (band), a South Korean boy band
 Sope (food), a Mexican food